Anthony White (born in Sydney, Australia in 1976) is an Australian visual artist. A National Art School, Sydney, graduate, White has worked and lived in Paris since 2009. White has held solo exhibitions in Sydney, Paris, London  and Hong Kong. Landscape and architectural references are used in White's work across the disciplines of drawing, painting, collage and sculpture.

Career

White's recent work, shown in the exhibition Signs of Civilization, reflects a move to socially engaged practice. Art writer Jane O'Neill says "White takes some cues from earlier activist artists such as Yves Klein or the post-war Japanese Gutai movement. Yet the driving force behind these works is Franz Kafka's 1919 novel In the Penal Colony, a story that pre-empts the current refugee crises throughout the Pacific. White describes how the exhibition "continues my sustained enquiry into the relationship between Modernism and colonialist concepts of empire". In doing so, he asserts the role of the artist as inherently political and urges us to consider the role of artistic interventions in the current climate."

White has been awarded a number of international commissions and residencies, which have reportedly been influential in developing his body of work, surveyed in White's solo exhibition at Le Pave D'Orsay, Paris (2014).

White received funding from the Australian Copyright Agency Ltd Career Fund in August 2015 to attend a lithographic printmaking workshop with Michael Woolworth in Paris. This resulted in the production of a seven-colour lithograph.

He was selected to participate in the 2017 International Painting Symposium at the Daugavpils Mark Rothko Art Centre, Latvia, in September 2017. He donated two works to the permanent collection of the museum. Of those work, White said "The works made during the symposium are a direct reaction to my lived experience in Europe, and at a more nuanced level in dialogue with the place, the reflections on Rothko himself and his use of colour as a vehicle to consider deeper aspects of humanity. Of particular interest to me is the sense one gets from his works about the inherent relationship between his use of colour and notions of human rights. What drew me to the Centre was to research how Rothko gave equal importance to both painting as a physical endeavour, as well as a philosophical enquiry." 

As well as his work being held in numerous private collections, White's portrait "Mandrake - Portrait of Baz Luhrmann" (charcoal on paper) was acquired in 2014 for the Australian Portrait Collection of the Tweed Regional Gallery and Margaret Olley Centre. This work was also a Finalist in the Kedumba Drawing Award 2014

Works

The Landscape is never Innocent - (After Mannalargenna)
White's recent work 'The Landscape is never Innocent - (After Mannalargenna)', Oil on linen, 150.5 cm x 121 cm, was Highly Commended in the 2018 Glover Prize for Landscape Painting. The Curator of the Glover Prize, Megan Dick, wrote "Anthony White's painting 'The Landscape is Never Innocent After Mannalargenna' re-examines a contested history in early Tasmanian settlement using bold red and black gestures to reflect upon and portray the confrontations between Aboriginal Tasmanians and Early European settlers". While the artist is quoted the background to the work as, "To me, there is a painfully clear disparity between the written history of Aboriginal Australia and actual events. Looking back at Australia from my adopted home in Europe it is clear to me that no meaningful reconciliation has taken place. As a nation Australia must adjust the record and make reparations towards its First Nations People."

Cape Tribulation I
White's work 'Cape Tribulation I' was selected as one of the Finalists in the 2017 Paddington Art Prize. The description of the work on the Prize website states "This work dwells upon personal memory and history of Cape Tribulation and consequences for Indigenous Australians. Cook mentioned that 'here began all our troubles' and marks the first squeegee group based paintings executed using ripolin paints".

Recognition and awards 
 2018 The Nancy Fairfax Studio Residency, Tweed Heads Regional Gallery and Margaret Olley Art Centre

 2018 Highly Commended, Glover Prize for Landscape Painting, The John Glover Society, Evandale, Tasmania. 'The Landscape is never Innocent After Mannarlargenna' was one of the Finalists of the Glover Prize for Landscape Painting in Tasmania (2018). Australia's richest prize for Landscape Painting |

 2017 Rothko International Symposium participant, Daugavpils Mark Rothko Art Center, Daugavpils, Latvia

 2017, 2016, 2005 Paddington Art Prize finalist

 2015 Lithograph project with Michael Woolworth Publications, Paris funded by The Creative Industries Career Fund, Copyright Agency Australia

 2014 Invited finalist, Kedumba Drawing Prize

 2010 Leipzig International Art Program

 2009 Artist in Residence at The Storrier Onslow National Art School Studio Residency Award at the Cité internationale des arts in Paris (Awarded by William Wright AM)

 2007 Recipient of the Marten Bequest for Painting

 2006 The Brett Whiteley Travelling Art Scholarship Finalist, Sydney

 2005 Recipient of The Elioth Gruner Prize for Landscape Painting, The Art Gallery of New South Wales

Exhibitions
White's works have been exhibited in Australia, France, Hong Kong, Germany and London: 
Nanda and Hobbs Contemporary, Sydney (2016 and 2018); Le Pave D'Orsay, Paris (two person show with Martin Brown, 2016; solo survey exhibition, 2014); Metro Gallery, Melbourne (2016  and 2015); Metro Gallery at Art Central Art Fair, Hong Kong (with John Olson, 2016); Le Salon des Réalités Nouvelles, Parc Floral de Paris (group show, 2015); the Cat Street Gallery, Hong Kong (2011, 2012, 2013); the Iain Dawson Gallery, Sydney (2010 and 2011); the 5x5 Contemporary Modern Australian Art exhibition at Menier Gallery, London (with Laith McGregor, Dennis Nonna, Helen Pynor and Tony Lloyd, 2010 and with Vexta, Linton Meagher and Erin Smith, 2011); and, LIA Leipzig, Germany (Rundgang The Winter Exhibition, curated by Anna Louise Kratzsch, 2010).

References

Australian artists
1976 births
Living people
Artists from Sydney
National Art School alumni
Australian diaspora
French artists